Croatia participated in the Eurovision Song Contest 2006 with the song "Moja štikla" written by Boris Novković, Franjo Valentić and Severina Vučković. The song was performed by Severina. Songwriter Boris Novković represented Croatia in the Eurovision Song Contest 2005 with the song "Vukovi umiru sami" together with Lado members where they placed eleventh in the grand final of the competition. The Croatian broadcaster Croatian Radiotelevision (HRT) organised the national final Dora 2006 to select the Croatian entry for the 2006 contest in Athens, Greece. Thirty-two entries competed in the national final which consisted of three shows: two semi-finals and a final. Eight entries qualified from each semi-final on 2 and 3 March 2006 to compete in the final on 4 March 2006. In the final, "Moja štikla" performed by Severina was selected as the winner following the combination of votes from a five-member jury panel and a public televote.

Croatia automatically qualified to compete in the final of the Eurovision Song Contest. Performing during the show in position 20, Croatia placed twelfth out of the 24 participating countries with 56 points.

Background 

The nation's best result in the contest was fourth, which it achieved on two occasions: in 1996 with the song "Sveta ljubav" performed by Maja Blagdan and in 1999 with the song "Marija Magdalena" performed by Doris Dragović. In 2005, Croatia managed to qualify to the final with Boris Novković featuring Lado Members and the song "Vukovi umiru sami".

The Croatian national broadcaster, Croatian Radiotelevision (HRT), broadcasts the event within Croatia and organises the selection process for the nation's entry. HRT confirmed Croatia's participation in the 2006 Eurovision Song Contest on 16 January 2006. Since 1993, HRT organised the national final Dora in order to select the Croatian entry for the Eurovision Song Contest, a method that was continued for their 2006 participation.

Before Eurovision

Dora 2006 
Dora 2006 was the fourteenth edition of the Croatian national selection Dora which selected Croatia's entry for the Eurovision Song Contest 2006. The competition consisted of two semi-finals on 2 and 3 March 2006 and a final on 4 March 2006, all taking place at the Hotel Kvarner in Opatija and broadcast on HTV1.

Format 
Thirty-two songs competed in Dora 2006 which consisted of three shows: two semi-finals and a final. Sixteen songs competed in each semi-final with the top eight proceeding to complete the sixteen-song lineup in the final. The results of all shows were determined by public televoting and the votes from a jury panel. The ranking developed by both streams of voting was converted to points from 1 (lowest) to 16 (highest) and assigned to the competing songs. Ties were decided in favour of the entry that received the most points from the jury.

The jury that voted in all three shows consisted of:

 Silvije Glojnarić – HRT
 Robert Urlić – HR
 Željen Klašterka – HTV
 Ljiljana Vinković – HTV
 Aleksandar Kostadinov – HTV

Competing entries 
HRT announced the thirty-two competing entries on 10 February 2006 and among the artists were Magazin which represented Croatia in the Eurovision Song Contest 1995, Danijela Martinović who represented Croatia in the Eurovision Song Contest 1995 as part of Magazin and 1998, and Claudia Beni who represented Croatia in the Eurovision Song Contest 2003. The artists and songs for the competition were selected by a five-member expert committee consisting of Silvije Glojnarić (HRT), Robert Urlić (HR), Željen Klašterka (HTV), Ljiljana Vinković (HTV) and Aleksandar Kostadinov (HTV) after artists and composers were directly invited by HRT to submit their entries.

Shows

Semi-finals 
The two semi-finals took place on 2 and 3 March 2006. The first semi-final was hosted by Duško Ćurlić, Mirko Fodor and member of Yugoslav Eurovision Song Contest 1989 winner Riva Emilija Kokić in the first semi-final, while the second semi-final was hosted by Duško Ćurlić, Mirko Fodor and 2002 Croatian Eurovision entrant Vesna Pisarović. The eight qualifiers for the final from each semi-final were determined by a 50/50 combination of votes from a five-member jury panel and a public televote.

In addition to the performances of the competing entries, former Croatian Eurovision entrants performed as the interval acts during the semi-finals. Riva, Dubrovački trubaduri (1968 for Yugoslavia), E.N.I. (1997), Goran Karan (2000), Claudia Beni (2003) and Boris Novković (2005) performed in the first semi-final, while Vesna Pisarović, Krunoslav Slabinac (1971 for Yugoslavia), Put (1993), Magazin (1995), Danijela Martinović (1995 and 1998), Vanna (2001) and Ivan Mikulić (2004) performed in the second semi-final.

Final 
The final took place on 4 March 2006, hosted by Duško Ćurlić, Mirko Fodor, member of Yugoslav Eurovision Song Contest 1989 winner Riva Emilija Kokić and 2002 Croatian Eurovision entrant Vesna Pisarović. The winner, "Moja štikla" performed by Severina, was determined by a 50/50 combination of votes from a five-member jury panel and a public televote. In addition to the performances of the competing entries, Lady Swing performed as the interval act during the show.

At Eurovision
According to Eurovision rules, all nations with the exceptions of the host country, the "Big Four" (France, Germany, Spain and the United Kingdom) and the ten highest placed finishers in the 2005 contest are required to qualify from the semi-final in order to compete for the final; the top ten countries from the semi-final progress to the final. Following Serbia and Montenegro's withdrawal from the contest on 15 March and subsequent removal from the final, Croatia which placed eleventh in the 2005 contest took its place and automatically qualified to compete in the final on 20 May 2006. On 21 March 2006, a special allocation draw was held which determined the running order and Croatia was set to perform in position 20, following the entry from France and before the entry from Ireland. Croatia placed twelfth in the final, scoring 56 points.

Both the semi-final and the final were broadcast in Croatia on HRT with commentary by Duško Ćurlić. The Croatian spokesperson, who announced the Croatian votes during the final, was Mila Horvat.

Voting 
Below is a breakdown of points awarded to Croatia and awarded by Croatia in the semi-final and grand final of the contest. The nation awarded its 12 points to Bosnia and Herzegovina in the semi-final and the final of the contest.

Points awarded to Croatia

Points awarded by Croatia

References

2006
Countries in the Eurovision Song Contest 2006
Eurovision